Cnephasia alfacarana is a species of moth of the family Tortricidae. It is found in Portugal and Spain.

The wingspan is 17–21 mm.

References

Moths described in 1958
alfacarana